The Mizoram Police Force is the law enforcing agency of the state of Mizoram, India.

Administration

The administrative control of Mizoram Police vests with the Home Minister of Mizoram who holds the portfolio of Home Minister. The supervision and coordination of Police is done by the Home Department, Govt. of Mizoram. The force is headed by Mr. Devesh Chandra Srivastva IPS. Mizoram is divided into ELeven Districts, Each District is headed by one Superintendent of Police.

Insignia/Ranks of Mizoram Police

Ranges
Mizoram Police has Two Police Ranges Namely Northern and Southern Ranges, which are headed by a Deputy Inspector General of Police Northern and Southern respectively.

Training and development 
Mizoram Police has two (2) Training Centres. The two training centres are at Mualvum and Thenzawl. Currently, Police Training Centre Thenzawl is the active training centre for its general employees. Officer cadres are sent for training at North East Police Academy (NEPA).

General Basic training courses are for nine (9) months.

Mizoram Police under Police Modernization Scheme runs Crime and Criminal Tracking Network & Systems which links every Police station in Mizoram through Wide Area Network (WAN).

Forensic Science Department 

Government of Mizoram established Forensic Science Laboratory under the administrative control of Police Department Vide Notification No. A/12034/1/97-HMP dated 31/7/2000. Forensic Science Laboratory, Mizoram started functioning initially with only one division i.e. chemistry, Mizoram FSL now have 8(eight) divisions viz. Chemistry, Questioned Document, Ballistics & Toolmarks, Fingerprint, Photography, DNA/Serology, Toxicology and Cyber Forensics, and headed by Director rank Forensic Scientist. The Laboratory was upgraded to a full-fledged Directorate in March, 2015 which is in par with the guidelines of National Human Rights Commission.

Vehicles

Weapons

Recruitments

Entries are done at the following ranks:
1. Constables / Lady constables, Sub Inspectors and Lady Sub inspectors: Appointment done through Mizoram Police Recruitment Board.
2. Mizoram Police Service: Officers selected through Mizoram Public Service Commission (Group-A) etc. Examination conducted by Mizoram Public Service Commission  are appointed as Deputy Superintendents of Police.
4. Indian Police Service: Officers selected through Civil Service Examinations conducted by Union Public Service Commission  are appointed as Deputy Superintendent of Police or higher.

Notes

References

External links
 Official website of Mizoram Police

State law enforcement agencies of India
Government of Mizoram
Government agencies with year of establishment missing